North Derbyshire was a Parliamentary constituency in the United Kingdom constituencies. It originally returned two Knights of the Shire to the House of Commons of the Parliament of the United Kingdom.

The constituency was created when Derbyshire constituency was split into North Derbyshire and South Derbyshire under the 1832 Reform Act. It was abolished in 1885, together with the constituencies of South Derbyshire and East Derbyshire. In 1885 the area of the three constituencies was split between the new smaller constituencies of Chesterfield, Mid Derbyshire, North-East Derbyshire, South Derbyshire, West Derbyshire, High Peak and Ilkeston.

Boundaries 
1832–1868: The Hundreds of High Peak and Scarsdale, and so much of the Wapentake of Wirksworth as was comprised in the Bakewell Division.

1868–1885: The Hundred of High Peak and the Wapentake of Wirksworth.

Members of Parliament

Election results

Elections in the 1830s

Cavendish succeeded to the peerage, becoming 7th Duke of Devonshire and causing a by-election.

Elections in the 1840s

Elections in the 1850s

 

Evans resigned, causing a by-election.

 

Evans resigned before the poll concluded.

Elections in the 1860s

Elections in the 1870s

Elections in the 1880s

 

Source

See also 
List of former United Kingdom Parliament constituencies
Unreformed House of Commons

References 

Parliamentary constituencies in Derbyshire (historic)
Constituencies of the Parliament of the United Kingdom established in 1832
Constituencies of the Parliament of the United Kingdom disestablished in 1885